State Route 193 (SR 193) is a  route that serves as the primary travel route into Dauphin Island through southern Mobile County.  South of its intersection with Laurendine Road, SR 193 is known as Dauphin Island Parkway, with the northern half of Dauphin Island Parkway routed along SR 163.  The northern portion of SR 193 is known as Range Line Road.

Route description

The southern terminus of SR 193 is located at the western terminus of the Fort Morgan ferry in eastern Dauphin Island. From this point, the route travels in a westerly direction before turning to the north off the island across the Gordon Persons Bridge spanning the Mississippi Sound. From this point, the route travels across Mon Louis Island, over Fowl River, and continues onward in a northerly direction, where it has a full cloverleaf interchange with I-10 at exit 17 before reaching its northern terminus at US 90 in Tillmans Corner.

History
SR 193 originated as a state highway designation for Wilson Avenue from US 43 to US 45 in Prichard, which was decommissioned in 1981 along with SR 194 (which was relocated elsewhere by 1987). The number was used again by 1985 on the current route.

Major intersections

References

External links

Alabama 193 Endings
Alabama 193 at AARoads.com

193
Transportation in Mobile County, Alabama